Jeffrey D. Jordan is an American venture capitalist at the Silicon Valley firm Andreessen Horowitz and the former President and CEO of OpenTable.

Early career
From 2004 to 2006, Jordan was the president of PayPal. Prior to that, Jordan was senior vice president and general manager at eBay North America for five years, where he ran eBay.com and led eBay’s acquisitions of PayPal and Half.com.  Before eBay, Jordan held various executive roles at Hollywood Entertainment (CFO) and The Walt Disney Company. Prior to his stint at the Walt Disney Company, Jordan was a management consultant at the Boston Consulting Group upon graduating from the Stanford Graduate School of Business.

Jordan was President and CEO of OpenTable from 2007 to 2011. In May 2009, OpenTable’s initial public offering raised $31.4 million, giving the company a market capitalization of $432 million. OpenTable shares rose 72 percent during its first day of trading on NASDAQ and its IPO was considered an “extremely healthy” one during the economic recession.

Jordan also serves on the board of directors for OpenTable, Wealthfront and Zoosk. In June 2017, he joined the Cadre board, a real estate investing company Andreessen Horowitz is investing in. He's also been an active investor and adviser in Silicon Valley for several years, with involvements in Pure Digital (the maker of the Flip Video camera later acquired by Cisco), Hotwire.com (acquired by Expedia), Tiny Prints (acquired by Shutterfly) and CafePress (which went public in 2012).

Andreessen Horowitz
Jordan became Andreessen Horowitz’s fifth general partner in June 2011. In July 2011, Jordan led Airbnb’s $112 million Series B funding from a group of investors including Andreessen Horowitz; he also serves on their board. Jordan’s additional board seats on behalf of Andreessen Horowitz include Belly, Circle, Tilt.com, Fab.com, Instacart, Lookout, Twice, Walker & Co., 500px, Accolade and Pinterest. Jordan also oversees the firm’s investments in Fanatics, Julep  and zulily.

Philanthropy
In April 2012, Jordan along with Andreessen Horowitz General Partners Marc Andreessen, Ben Horowitz, John O’Farrell, Scott Weiss, and Peter Levine pledged to give half of their lifetime income from venture capital to charity.

Personal life

References

External links
 Andreessen Horowitz Website
 Jeff Jordan's Blog

Living people
American computer businesspeople
American venture capitalists
American company founders
Amherst College alumni
Place of birth missing (living people)
Year of birth missing (living people)
American philanthropists
Stanford Graduate School of Business alumni
American chief executives of financial services companies
American chief financial officers
American corporate directors
Andreessen Horowitz